Allenton is a suburb of Ashburton, in the Ashburton District and Canterbury Region of New Zealand's South Island.

The suburb has its own rugby club.

Ashburton Hospital is located in Allenton. It is a public hospital of Canterbury District Health Board with 54 beds, which provides maternity, medical and surgical services.

Demographics

Allenton had a population of 6,789 at the 2018 New Zealand census, an increase of 459 people (7.3%) since the 2013 census, and an increase of 1,101 people (19.4%) since the 2006 census. There were 2,673 households. There were 3,324 males and 3,468 females, giving a sex ratio of 0.96 males per female, with 1,254 people (18.5%) aged under 15 years, 1,107 (16.3%) aged 15 to 29, 2,787 (41.1%) aged 30 to 64, and 1,644 (24.2%) aged 65 or older.

Ethnicities were 85.1% European/Pākehā, 7.5% Māori, 6.0% Pacific peoples, 6.1% Asian, and 1.8% other ethnicities (totals add to more than 100% since people could identify with multiple ethnicities).

The proportion of people born overseas was 17.4%, compared with 27.1% nationally.

Although some people objected to giving their religion, 40.1% had no religion, 50.7% were Christian, 1.1% were Hindu, 0.3% were Muslim, 0.5% were Buddhist and 1.5% had other religions.

Of those at least 15 years old, 723 (13.1%) people had a bachelor or higher degree, and 1,311 (23.7%) people had no formal qualifications. The employment status of those at least 15 was that 2,634 (47.6%) people were employed full-time, 867 (15.7%) were part-time, and 126 (2.3%) were unemployed.

References

Suburbs of Ashburton